Savage Planet is a Sci Fi Pictures original film that premiered August 12, 2006 on the Sci Fi Channel.

Plot
In the year 2068, Earth can no longer sustain human life with its natural resources depleted beyond repair. Whereas other companies are seeking to colonize the Moon, Calron sets its aim much higher: the planet Oxygen whose potential could save billions of lives. However, since it is 20,000 light-years away, a technology known as DST (or deep-space teleporting) has to be used to get there. A team, led by Randall Cain (played by Sean Patrick Flanery), arrives but soon discover that it is home to a terror in the form of voracious, enormous, prehistoric bears and the planet itself is in an unstable condition. The team soon tries to escape from the planet, but are confronted by many ordeals. By the time the movie is over, the only two left alive is Allison Carlson (played by Reagan Pasternak) and Cain (played by Sean Patrick Flanery), who manage to teleport back to Earth.

Cast
 Sean Patrick Flanery as Randall Cain
 Reagan Pasternak as Allison Carlson
 Sarah Danielle Madison as Gretchen Miller
 James McGowan as John Stotzer
 David Sparrow as Carter Mason
 Joel S. Keller as Duncan West
 Roman Podhora as James Carlson
 Michelle Stephenson as Keira Blackburn
 Kevin Hanchard as Vickers
 Anthony Ashbee as Joe Alvares
 Jake Simons as Edward Harling
 Brandi Marie Ward as Ellen Bertzyk

References

External links

American Cinema International Travels to Savage Planet with a Sci Fi Original
Savage Planet at Scifipedia
Sci Fi Channel's Savage Planet site

2006 television films
2006 films
Syfy original films
English-language Canadian films
Films set in the 2060s
Canadian science fiction television films
Films set on fictional planets
Films set in 2068
2000s English-language films
2000s American films
2000s Canadian films